Gabrielė Martirosian (born Martirosianaitė; 23 February 1991 in Kaunas) is a Lithuanian model, actress and radio and television presenter. She is best known as Miss Lithuania 2008.

Career 
Martirosian started her career as a model with the Modilinos agency in 2007, with her first two contracts involving working in Tokyo and Bangkok.

In 2008, she was selected as Miss Lithuania, subsequently representing Lithuania in that year's Miss World in Johannesburg. However, she did not progress beyond the first round.

She was selected as an ambassador for Vilnius' European Capital of Culture celebrations in 2009.

She founded the clothing label Oh! Skin in 2015 and the nail art salon Nail Game in 2017.

TV and radio 
Between 2009 and 2010, Martirosian played the role of Monika in the TV series .

After graduating from Vilnius University, she worked as a presenter on M-1 between 2013 and 2015.

Since 2019, Martirosian has been a presenter on LRT Radijas. She has become known to an international audience for hosting the Lithuanian national selection for the Eurovision Song Contest, alongside  in 2017,  in 2019 and Masalskis and Ieva Zasimauskaitė in 2020.

Film 

Personal life 
Martirosian grew up in Akademija, but spent her summer holidays with her grandparents in Mosėdis and Šilutė.

Her grandfather, Akiles Martirosianas, was born Akilles Martirosyan in Yerevan, but had the ending -as added to his surname when he emigrated to Lithuania. Martirosian confirmed in July 2019 that she and her family had changed their surname to reflect their Armenian ancestry.

See also

References 

1991 births
Lithuanian television presenters
Lithuanian women television presenters
Beauty pageant contestants
Lithuanian models
Actors from Kaunas
Vilnius University alumni
Living people
Lithuanian people of Armenian descent